Sand Lake is an unincorporated community and census-designated place (CDP) in Iosco County in the U.S. state of Michigan. The CDP had a population of 1,412 at the 2010 census.  The CDP occupies portions of Grant Township, Plainfield Township, and Wilber Township.

Geography
The CDP encompasses multiple lakes, including Bass Lake, Chappell Lake, Floyd Lake, Indian Lake, Island Lake, Little Island Lake, Round Lake, and Sand Lake.

References

Unincorporated communities in Iosco County, Michigan
Census-designated places in Michigan
Unincorporated communities in Michigan
Census-designated places in Iosco County, Michigan